The  was a limited-stop train service that operated until November 2002 in Japan on the Joetsu Shinkansen high-speed line between Tokyo and Niigata.

Operations

Rolling stock

 200 series 10/12-car sets (November 1982 – November 2002)
 E1 series 12-car sets, as Max Asahi (July 1994 – November 2002)
 E2 series 8-car sets (December 1998 – November 2002)
 E4 series 8-car sets, as Max Asahi (May 2001 – November 2002)

History
The name Asahi, meaning "morning sun" in Japanese, dates from before World War II, when it was used for an express train operated by Japan from Rason in Korea (present-day North Korea) to Hsinking in Manchuria (present-day China).

This service was renamed Benibana from 1 July 1982.

At the start of Joetsu Shinkansen operations in 1982, 11 Asahi services operated in each direction daily. With the start of shinkansen operations from Ueno on 14 March 1985, the number of Asahi services was increased to 34 in each direction daily. New E1 series "Max" 12-car sets were introduced on Max Asahi services from 15 July 1994, with two workings in each direction daily between Tokyo and Niigata. The number of Max Asahi services was increased to five in each direction daily from 3 December 1994. E4 series "Max" trains built in 1997 were first assigned to Max Asahi services on 7 May 2001.

The Asahi name was discontinued from 1 December 2002 when the Toki name was re-introduced for all Tokyo to Niigata trains.

See also
 List of named passenger trains of Japan

References

Jōetsu Shinkansen
Railway services introduced in 1960
Railway services discontinued in 2002
Named Shinkansen trains

ja:とき (列車)